Arthur Roy Traum (April 3, 1943 – July 20, 2008) was an American guitarist, songwriter, and producer. Traum's work appeared on more than 35 albums. He produced and recorded with The Band, Arlen Roth, Warren Bernhardt, Pat Alger, Tony Levin, John Sebastian, Richie Havens, Maria Muldaur, Eric Andersen, Paul Butterfield, Paul Siebel, Rory Block, James Taylor, Pete Seeger, David Grisman, Livingston Taylor, Michael Franks and Happy Traum, among others.  Traum's songs were featured on PBS, BBC, ESPN, CBS, and The Weather Channel. He toured in Japan, Europe and the U.S.

Biography 

Born and raised in the Bronx, Traum became a part of the Greenwich Village folk music scene in the late 1950s. Early on, Traum co-wrote songs for the Brian De Palma debut film Greetings – the first role for Robert De Niro – with Eric Kaz and Bear.

1969 saw Traum joining forces with his brother Happy Traum in a duo. Their self-titled debut album, Happy & Artie Traum (Capitol Records) was cited by the New York Times as "one of the best records in any field of pop music." The Traums were managed by Albert Grossman (manager of The Band, Dylan, Janis Joplin, etc.). The duo performed at the 1969 Newport Folk Festival on stage with James Taylor, Kris Kristofferson and Joni Mitchell.

In November 1971, both Artie and Happy Traum (together with Bob Dylan, David Amram, and others) participated in an extended Record Plant (NYC) session backing up  Allen Ginsberg in various songs and chants. Ginsberg wrote the liner notes for the duo's Hard Times in the Country LP. Reviewing the LP in Christgau's Record Guide: Rock Albums of the Seventies (1981), Robert Christgau wrote: "If you're a sucker for folkie nonsense—ramblin' mythopoeia, articulated sentiment, purty tunes—you might as well buy it from real folkies on a real, struggling folkie label. Bonus: 'Gambler's Song,' Artie's uncharacteristically ironic tale of anomie, which ought to be recorded by somebody who'll get it heard."

During the 1970s and 1980s, Artie Traum produced The Woodstock Mountains Revue featuring himself, his brother Happy, Roly Salley Pat Alger, John Sebastian, Arlen Roth, Maria Muldaur, Rory Block, Eric Andersen, Paul Butterfield and Paul Siebel. In the mid-1980s Traum teamed up with singer/songwriter Pat Alger (Thunder Rolls, Unanswered Prayers). The duo recorded the album From The Heart. Traum released his first solo album, Life on Earth, in 1977 on Rounder Records.

Traum's 1994 release – the jazz project Letters From Joubee – captured #1 on the Smooth Jazz Radio Charts (Gavin AA chart). In 1999 his Meetings With Remarkable Friends – which included tracks featuring Traum playing with The Band, Bela Fleck, Jay Ungar, and other notables – received the Best Acoustic Instrumental Album award from the NAV.

In 2003, Traum released a singer/songwriter project, South of Lafayette, which was featured on NPR's "All Things Considered". In 2007 Traum released the album Thief of Time.

During recent years, Traum enjoyed a small side career as a documentary filmmaker. In 2002, his film Deep Water: Building the Catskill Water System (co-produced and co-directed with Tobe Carey and Robbie Dupree) was featured at the Woodstock Film Festival. Two years later, in 2004, Traum co-produced Hudson River Journeys: A Celebration of America's First River for WMHT Public Television. The latter film featured artist Len Tantillo and folksinger Pete Seeger.

Traum also wrote numerous guitar instruction books, and hosted many video productions for his brother Happy's Homespun Music Instruction. Traum lived with his wife Beverly in Bearsville, New York, just outside Woodstock. At the time of his death, Traum had been at work on a memoir. Traum died of ocular cancer on July 20, 2008, at Bearsville, aged 65.

Discography

Studio albums
 1977: Life On Earth (Rounder)
 1980: From The Heart (Rounder) with Pat Alger
 1986: Cayenne (Rounder)
 1993: Letters From Joubée (Shanachie)
 1996: The View from Here (Shanachie)
 1999: Meetings With Remarkable Friends (Narada)
 2001: More Music For A Stress-Free Day (Hallmark)
 2001: The Last Romantic: An American Guitar Story (Narada)
 2002: South of Lafayette (Roaring Stream)
 2004: Acoustic Jazz Guitar (Roaring Stream)
 2007: Thief Of Time (Roaring Stream)

With Happy Traum
 1970: Happy And Artie Traum (Capitol)
 1971: Double-Back (Capitol)
 1975: Hard Times In The Country (Rounder)
 1994: Test of Time (Roaring Stream)

As composer
 1968: Bear – Greetings, Children Of Paradise (Verve Forecast) – track 1, "Greetings!" (co-written with Eric Kaz, Michael Soles, and Steve Soles); track 5, "What Difference" (co-written with Marc Silber); track 10, "The Hungry Days Of New Mexico"
 1972: Buzzy Linhart – Buzzy (Kama Sutra) – track 1, "Tornado"
 1977: David Grisman Quintet – The David Grisman Quintet (Kaleidoscope) – track 6, "Fish Scale"
 1977: various artists – Woodstock Mountains: More Music from Mud Acres (Rounder) – track 2, "Cold Front"; track 13, "Barbed Wire"
 1978: Richard Greene – Duets (Rounder) – track 6, "Fish Scale"
 1993: The Band – Jericho (Pyramid) – track 8,  "Amazon (River Of Dreams)"
 1995: Tony Rice and John Carlini – River Suite for Two Guitars (Sugar Hill) – track 7, "Fish Scale"
 1996: The Unherd – Looking for the Light (SongShine) – track 9, "Poison Rain" (co-written with Larry Hoppen)
 2001: Joe Flood – Cripplin' Crutch (Diesel Only) – track 3, "Niagara" (co-written with Jim Weider and Joe Flood)
 2003: 4 Way Street – Pretzel Park (Sanctuary) – track 12, "Barbed Wire"
 2007: Eugene Ruffolo – In a Different Light (Stockfisch) – track 9, "The Hills Of Sicily" (co-written with Eugene Ruffolo)
 2011: Larry Hoppen – One of the Lucky Ones (Spectra) – track 9, "Poison Rain" (co-written with Larry Hoppen)
 Millpond Moon – Broke In Brooklyn (Tikopia) ' track 1, "Barbed Wire"

As producer
 1976: Tom Akstens – Original & Traditional Music (Takoma)
 1977: various artists – Woodstock Mountains: More Music from Mud Acres (Rounder)
 1978: Arlen Roth – Guitarist (Rounder)
 1981: Woodstock Mountain Revue – Back to Mud Acres (Rounder)
 1983: Priscilla Herdman – Seasons of Change (Flying Fish) – assistant producer, arranger
 1987: Arlen Roth – Arlen Roth (Rounder)
 1988: Anne Hills – Woman Of A Calm Heart (Flying Fish)
 1988: Livingston Taylor – Life Is Good (Critique)
 1990: Amy & Leslie – Amy & Leslie (Alcazar)
 1991: Livingston Taylor – Our Turn To Dance (Vanguard)
 1995: Diane Zeigler – Sting of the Honeybee (Decca / Philo)
 1999: Alex de Grassi – Bolivian Blues Bar (Narada Jazz)
 1999: Don Ross – Passion Session (Narada)
 1999: Laurence Juber – Altered Reality (Narada)
 1999: Mikhail Horowitz – The Blues Of the Birth (Euphoria Jazz)
 2000: Tony Levin – Waters of Eden (Narada)
 2005: Happy Traum, I Walk the Road Again (Roaring Stream)

Also appears on

1963 – 1979
 1963: The True Endeavor Jug Band – The Art Of The Jug Band (Prestige Folklore) – banjo, guitar,  kazoo, vocals
 1965: Judy Roderick – Woman Blue (Vanguard) – guitar
 1968: David Santo – Silver Currents (Phoenix Records Of New York) – guitar
 1969: Fat City – Reincarnation (Probe) – guitar
 1970: Kathy Smith – Some Songs I've Saved (Fallout) – banjo, guitar
 1970: Happy Traum – Bright Morning Stars (Greenhays) – vocals
 1972: Mud Acres – Music Among Friends (Rounder) – guitar, bass, vocals
 1975: Rab Noakes – Never Too Late (Warner Bros.) – guitar
 1976: Harry Tuft – Across The Blue Mountains (Folk-Legacy) – guitar
 1976: Rory Block – I'm in Love (Blue Goose) – guitar
 1978: Happy Traum – American Stranger (Kicking Mule) – guitar 
 1978: Woodstock Mountains Revue – Pretty Lucky (Rounder) – guitar, vocals

1980 – present
 1987: Priscilla Herdman – Darkness into Light (Flying Fish) – guitar
 1988: Rachel Faro – Windsong (Blue Flame) – guitar
 1988: Priscilla Herdman – Stardreamer: Nightsongs & Lullabies (Alacazam / Alcazar)
 1993: Christopher Shaw – Adirondack (Hudson River) – guitar
 1993: Bridget Ball – Bricks and Windows (Hudson River) – guitar
 1993: Priscilla Herdman – Daydreamer
 1993: Allen Power – The Healing Arts (Beacon) – guitar
 1994: Amy & Leslie – Take Me Home (Shanachie) – guitar
 1994: Happy Train: Test of Time (Roaring Steam) – guitar
 1995: Priscilla Herdman – Forever & Always (Flying Fish) – guitar, arranger
 1996: Rory Block – Turning Point (Munich) – vocals
 2000: Eric Andersen – You Can't Relive the Past (Appleseed) – guitar
 2003: Priscilla Herdman – The Road Home (Redwing) – guitar
 2004: Cindy Cashdollar – Slide Show (Silver Shot) – guitar on track 12, "Locust Grove"
 2004: Priscilla Herdman – Stardreamer (Stardreamer Music) – guitar
 2009: BeauSoleil avec Michael Doucet – Alligator Purse (Yep Roc) – vocals

References

External links 

 Official website
 
 

1943 births
2008 deaths
People from the Bronx
Musicians from New York (state)
American folk musicians
Deaths from cancer in New York (state)
Record producers from New York (state)
20th-century American musicians